Matteo Caglieris (born 1 May 1955) is an Italian rower. He competed in the men's coxless four event at the 1976 Summer Olympics.

References

1955 births
Living people
Italian male rowers
Olympic rowers of Italy
Rowers at the 1976 Summer Olympics
Rowers from Milan